MS Knyaz Vladimir is a 1971 built car ferry/cruise ferry which was later rebuilt into a cruise ship in 1981. She is the last surviving ship ever owned by the Chandris Lines. She is the last surviving ship out of three near identical sisters, the others being the ill-fated Scandinavian Star and the Fred. Olsen & Co. ferry Bolero. In late 2014, Mano Cruise stopped the ship's service.

1971-1987
In 1971, the British company Southern Ferries, a subsidiary of P&O Ferries, launched the MV Eagle for a new car/cruise ferry service, a six-day-long Southampton-Lisbon-Tangier itinerary. She did not stay in service with her original owners for very long, as the route she was designed for proved unsuccessful, and in 1975 she was sold to the Paquet Cruises subsidiary Nouvelle Cie. de Paquebots. Her new owners had her repainted white and renamed Azur, carrying out cruise and ferry voyages in the Mediterranean. This continued on uneventfully until 1981 when Paquet decided to drop ferry services completely and rebuild Azur into a full-time cruise ship, with many extra cabins being built into her car decks, and an extra swimming pool installed on her stern. In 1987 Paquet sold Azur to the Greek cruise company Chandris Lines.

1987-2004

Upon entering service with Chandris's subsidiary Chandris Fantasy Cruises, she was renamed The Azur, and her funnels were painted the traditional Chandris blue with a white chi. By 1994 Chandris was "phasing out" their Fantasy Cruises brand, doing so by selling The Azur to Festival Cruises. Festival had The Azur cruise on voyages out of Venice and Genoa until they declared bankruptcy in 2004. When this happened The Azur was placed under arrest by harbor authorities Gibraltar. At Festival Cruises bankruptcy sale, The Azur was sold to the Israel-based Mano Maritime for over US$10 million.

2005-Present
Upon entering service for them, Mano Maritime renamed her the Royal Iris and painted a smiling yellow fish on both sides of her hull. On 21 June 2005 a small fire broke out on board while the ship was anchored of Samos. It was quickly extinguished by the crew. Until 2014 Royal Iris regularly set out on cruises through the Greek Islands and Cyprus. In 2014 Mano Cruises stopped the ship's operations, and renamed it to Roy Star. The liner arrived in the Greek port of Chalcis (Chalkida) for lay up on November 6, 2014.
On 28 January 2017 Cruise Industry News reported that the vessel would enter into service for Sovfracht and Rosmorport in a joint venture calling on ports in the Black Sea including Crimea, Yalta, Sevastopol and Istanbul, with the ship sailing round-trip from Sochi. Ship was bought for around 11.2 million euros. A new company was founded "Black Sea Cruises" based in Sochi. The ship has Russian flag.

On board features
On board Royal Iris there are three swimming pools, two night clubs, a discotheque, sauna, sports facilities, a casino, hairdressing salon and movie theater.

References

External links
 
 Professional photographs from shipspotting.com
 

Cruise ships
Maritime incidents in 2005
1970 ships
Ferries of the United Kingdom
Ships built by Chantiers de l'Atlantique
Passenger ships of France
Passenger ships of Israel
Cruise ships of Greece